Peter Huang is a music video director. He won the 2020 Prism Prize for directing the music video for Jessie Reyez's "Far Away". He had previously been shortlisted for the Prism Prize in 2018 (for "Gatekeeper" by Reyez)  and in 2019 (for "Body Count" by Reyez). He was also longlisted for the Prism Prize in 2017 and 2019 (for "Can I Get a Witness" and "Have a Nice Day" by SonReal). In 2017, Huang was nominated for four iHeartRadio Much Music Video Awards: Video of the Year ("Fireproof" by Coleman Hell), Pop Video of the Year (for "Fireproof" and also for "No Warm Up" by SonReal), and Fan Fave Video (for "Shutter Island" by Reyez). For directing "Gatekeeper", Huang was also nominated for the 2018 Juno Award for Video of the Year and the music video was nominated for the 2018 MTV Video Music Award for Best Video with a Social Message.

References 

Living people
Canadian music video directors
Year of birth missing (living people)